Live Between the Earth & Clouds is the first live DVD, and third live album, by the UK band Antimatter, released in 2017. The release is a two-disc format with Disc 1 being the DVD of the show, and Disc 2 being the live album of the same show

Track listing

Personnel
Mick Moss – vocals, guitar, lead guitar
Dave Hall – lead guitar, Ebow, Additional vocals
Ste Hughes – bass
Liam Edwards – drums
Audio produced by Daniel Cardoso and Mick Moss 
Mastered by Daniel Cardoso
Concert film directed by Adam Wright and Mick Moss
Film authoring, grading and post-production by Tomfoolery Ltd
Filmed and recorded before a live audience at De Boerderij, Zoetermeer, Netherlands, March 2016
Photography by Cristel Brouwer
Artwork, design and layout by Mick Moss for Music In Stone

References

External links
 Official site

2017 live albums
Antimatter (band) albums